Tinetto is an Italian island situated in the Gulf of La Spezia, in the eastern part of the Ligurian Sea. It is part of an archipelago of three closely spaced islands jutting out south from the mainland at Portovenere.  In 1997, the archipelago, together with Portovenere and the Cinque Terre, was designated by UNESCO as a World Heritage Site.

Wildlife 
A subspecies of the common wall lizard, Podarcis muralis tinettoi, is endemic to the island.

See also
 List of islands of Italy

Islands of Liguria
Italian Riviera
Ligurian Sea
Province of La Spezia
World Heritage Sites in Italy